Dubois Historic District is a national historic district located at Dubois, Clearfield County, Pennsylvania.  The district includes 54 contributing buildings in the central business district of Dubois.  The district consists of mostly commercial buildings built after the fire of 1888 and in a variety of popular architectural styles including Gothic Revival architecture, Italianate, and Romanesque Revival.  Notable buildings include the Hatten & Munch Building (1897), Moore & Schwern Building (c. 1890), Methodist Episcopal Church (1889), First Baptist Church (1891), Shaw Building (1895), and DuBois Public Library (1923).  Located in the district and separately listed was the Commercial Hotel.

It was added to the National Register of Historic Places in 1997.

References

Historic districts on the National Register of Historic Places in Pennsylvania
Gothic Revival architecture in Pennsylvania
Italianate architecture in Pennsylvania
Romanesque Revival architecture in Pennsylvania
Buildings and structures in Clearfield County, Pennsylvania
National Register of Historic Places in Clearfield County, Pennsylvania